is a single released by Gackt on January 26, 2005 under Nippon Crown. It peaked at seventh place on the Oricon weekly chart and charted for seven weeks.

Track listing

References

2005 singles
Gackt songs
Pop-folk songs
Songs written by Gackt
2005 songs